The Little House, also known as the Florence Shaw Demonstration Cottage, is a child-sized house in Shepherdstown, West Virginia. It is equipped with  electric power and a working fireplace, and is fully furnished. The house is located on the edge of the Shepherd Campus along Town Run. The play complex includes a small barn on the other side of Town Run.

References

External links
 Documentation of the Little House at the Library of Congress

Shepherdstown, West Virginia
Shepherd University